Kəmərqaya is a village and municipality in the Dashkasan District of Azerbaijan. The village had an Armenian population before the exodus of Armenians from Azerbaijan after the outbreak of the Nagorno-Karabakh conflict.

Toponymy 
The village is also known as Kiranzh and was known as Beriyaşen and Şarukkar until 1992.

Demographics 
The village has a population of 322.

References

External links 

Populated places in Dashkasan District